The  were a class of nineteen 1st Class destroyers built for the Imperial Japanese Navy during the 1930s, and operated by them during the Pacific War, when all but one were lost.

The class was also one of a series called  within the Imperial Japanese Navy from their plan name. At the time of introduction, these destroyers were among the deadliest destroyers afloat, primarily due to the excellent range and lethality of their "Long Lance" torpedoes.

Background
It had a heavier main battery and much heavier torpedo armament than other contemporary foreign destroyer designs. The first 15 ships of this class were ordered in 1937 under the 3rd Naval Armaments Supplement Programme and the final four vessels were ordered in 1939 under the 4th Naval Armaments Supplement Programme. The final vessel in the class, was sometimes mistaken for part of the succeeding  by immediate postwar historians due to confusion over the number of fictitious destroyers listed in the Japanese budgetary records in an effort to conceal the budget devoted to the secret  battleships.

Design and description
The Kagerō class used the same hull and bridge as the preceding Asashio class and had an almost identical silhouette. The main visual difference was that the reloads for the forward torpedo launcher were located in front of the launcher instead of to the rear. The displacement and beam were thus slightly larger than for the Asashio class, giving greater stability.

Their crew numbered 240 officers and enlisted men. The ships had two Kampon geared steam turbines, each driving one propeller shaft, using steam provided by three Kampon water-tube boilers.

Armament
As built, the weapons suite of the Kagerō class was identical to that of the preceding Asashio class. The main battery consisted of six 5-inch 12.7 cm/50 Type 3 naval guns in three twin-gun turrets, one superfiring pair aft and one turret forward of the superstructure. The guns were capable of 55-degree elevation. The ships were also armed with eight  torpedo tubes for the oxygen-fueled Type 93 "Long Lance" torpedo in two quadruple traversing mounts; one reload was carried for each tube. Their anti-submarine weapons initially comprised 16 depth charges, which was increased to 36 during the course of the Pacific War.

In terms of anti-aircraft capability, initially two twin-mount Type 96 AA guns were placed forward of the second smokestack. As the war progressed, the number of Type 96 guns was gradually increased. In 1942–1943, the twin mounts were replaced by triple mounts, and another twin mount was added forward of the bridge. From 1943 to 1944, on surviving vessels the superfiring "X" turret was removed and replaced by two more triple mounts. In late 1944, the seven surviving vessels were fitted with a varying number of additional guns.  and  received seven single mounts, whereas  received 14 single mounts and four Type 93 13 mm machine guns.

 became the first Japanese destroyer to be equipped with radar when a Type 22 set was installed in late 1942. The other vessels were equipped with radar as they rotated back to Japan for repair or refit. All seven vessels surviving in mid-1944 also received a Type 13 radar.

Operational history

During the war the Kagerō class was used extensively in the Solomons campaign, and wartime attrition was severe, with 18 of 19 vessels lost. In all, six were sunk by air attack, five by submarine attack, five in battle with other surface forces, one by a mine, and the remaining two sunk by a combination of mines and air attack.  was the only Kagerō-class ship afloat at the end of the war.

Ships in class

Notes

References

Further reading
 , History of Pacific War Vol.64 Mutsuki class destroyer, Gakken (Japan), May 2008, 
 Collection of writings by Sizuo Fukui Vol.5, Stories of Japanese Destroyers, Kōjinsha (Japan) 1993, 
 Model Art Extra No.340, Drawings of Imperial Japanese Naval Vessels Part-1, Model Art Co. Ltd. (Japan), October 1989, Book code 08734-10
 Daiji Katagiri, Ship Name Chronicles of the Imperial Japanese Navy Combined Fleet, Kōjinsha (Japan), June 1988, 
 The Maru Special, Japanese Naval Vessels No.41 Japanese Destroyers I, Ushio Shobō (Japan), July 1980, Book code 68343-42

External links

 "Kagerō class" at CombinedFleet.com
 "KAGERŌ Class Notes by Allyn Nevitt"

Destroyer classes